The Victorian Head of the Schoolgirls regatta is contested between girls at schools from all across the state of Victoria Australia. Schools from the Girls Sport Victoria (GSV) and also Associated Public Schools of Victoria (APS), as well as smaller school rowing groups which enter under a rowing club banner, compete in a range of events over 1000m for the Year 9 and Year 10 events or 1500m for the Open events (typically girls in years 11 and 12).

Whereas in most rowing, coxswains can be of either sex, in the HOSG all coxswains must be female and attend the same school as the rowers of the crew that they are coxing.

The racing is usually held over an entire weekend (Friday, Saturday & Sunday) in mid-March on the Barwon River in Geelong. In 2022 the regatta was held on the third weekend of March, with all event heats on Friday the 18th, all repechages, all quarter-finals (for events with over 16 entries) and most semi-finals (for events with 16 entries or less) on Saturday the 19th and remaining semi-finals (for events with over 16 entries) and all finals on Sunday the 20th.

Head of the Schoolgirls is the largest single sex regatta in the southern hemisphere, with races starting every 3 minutes over the 3 days. In 2021, over 2100 girls participated in 51 events. In order to keep the regatta within a reasonable time frame and prevent large schools inundating the divisions of the smaller boats (eg. single sculls), girls are only permitted to race in one event over the weekend.

History
The first girl to row within the A.P.S. was a lone sculler from Geelong Grammar in 1972. There were 32 girls rowing by 1975, and in 1981, girls began competing at the Senior Regatta with Geelong Grammar, Geelong College, Melbourne Girls Grammar, Morongo Girls' College and Lauriston racing in 1st and 2nd Fours over 800m. Methodist Ladies' College, and Carey joined in 1982, with Carey boating a First Four in 1983.

1984 was the final year that non APS school girls participated in the APS Head of the River, with seven girls' crews rowing in the 1st, 2nd and 3rd Four events. The following year saw the regatta revert to an all APS event, with only Geelong Grammar and Geelong College boating a First Four. Carey reappeared in the First Fours in 1986, the same year that Wesley joined, and with Caulfield joining in 1987, all five co-educational schools were boating a first four over 1500m. Around this time, the Principal of the Morongo Girls' College initiated a meeting that established the Head of School Girls' Regatta (HOSG).

1984
Last year of schoolgirl participation in APS Head of the River. Principal of Morongo initiates meeting that establishes the HOSG Regatta.

1985

MLC host first HOSG in Ballarat - The Regatta consisted of Heats and Finals for 7 events in which 16 schools and 240 girls competed during a single day. There is no record of the number of spectators who attended. A strong cross wind at Ballarat made conditions very interesting for crews and officials.

1986
Ballarat Grammar and local schools host HOSG - 9 events.

1987
Wesley College host HOSG in Geelong - 9 events

1988
Lauriston host HOSG - 12 events

1989

Loreto Mandeville Hall host HOSG - 13 events

1990
MLC host HOSG - 14 events including Eights for first time

1991
MGGS host HOSG - 14 events. HOSG Regatta Committee incorporates as an Association.

1992
Morongo host HOSG - 18 events.  For the first time, the regatta is held over 2 days.

1993

Genazzano host HOSG - 22 events including Quad Sculls for first time. Timing system introduced.

1994
St Catherine's host HOSG - 24 events.

1995
Lauriston host HOSG - 26 events.

1996
Carey Grammar host HOSG - 27 events, 38 schools and 1275 competitors

1997

Loreto Mandeville Hall host HOSG - 28 events. Active For Life becomes Sponsor of HOSG Regatta.

1998
Sacred Heart College host HOSG - 31 events.

1999
Firbank host HOSG - 34 events.

2000
MLC host HOSG - 34 events, 41 schools and 1474 competitors. Sykes Racing becomes naming rights sponsor of HOSG Regatta.

2001

Melbourne Girls Grammar again host the regatta - 34 Events. Professional Event Managers, SSDF, appointed by the host school. City of Greater Geelong provides support for temporary infrastructure costs at this Major Event.

2002
The Committee hosts the regatta, replacing the Host School arrangement. SSDF is again the Event Manager, with the Geelong Rowing Association assuming a significant support role. a Long term agreement is entered into between Head of the Schoolgirls Regatta Committee, the City of Greater Geelong, and the Corangamite Catchment Management Authority to maintain the regatta at Geelong.

2005

The 371 crews with their associated 2009 athletes came from 41 Victorian schools. Entries varied from a lone sculler and coach to 195 participants from a large girls' school. There were 28 fastest times recorded during the two days racing. For the first time Rowing Victoria carried out the dual role of providing the officials and being the Event Manager.

2007
On the realigned Barwon River course the increased use of repechage for 1500m crews was a great success and the new Judges' Box proved its worth . There was a noticeable increase in single scull entries.

2008
New Events to the program were the senior third eight.

2009
New Events to the program were the year 9 and 10 division five quad sculls.

2013
New Events to the program were the year 9 and 10 division six quad sculls.

2014
New Events to the program were the year 9 and 10 division seven quad sculls. This year was also the last year the regatta was held purely on the Saturday and Sunday.

2015
Changes to the regatta format included moving the Open (Years 11 & 12) event heats to Friday afternoon

2016
Changes to the regatta format included the introduction of exhaustive finals for Open events.

2017
New Events to the program were the Open Double Scull and Year 9 division eight quad scull. Changes to the regatta format included the introduction of exhaustive finals for Year 10 events.

2018
According to the 2018 HOSG regatta Bulletin, the regatta format was updated to provide for exhaustive finals for all crews, at all year levels. If necessary, the addition of a fifth round of racing (heats-repechages-qtr finals-semis-finals) was added to the program to a number of events with more than 16 competitors. The open 8 division 4 was also added to the program for the first time. Unfortunately due to extremely windy conditions, the finals day of racing on Sunday was largely cancelled. No A Final races were rowed in the 2018 edition, with all racing being cancelled after just five year 9 Coxed Quad scull minor finals had been held. The HOSG committee subsequently provided a specially minted a special 2018 A Finalist Medal for all members of crews who achieved that position.

2019
The 2019 edition of the HOSG regatta was the first to hold the exhaustive finals for all divisions and all boat classes of all year levels. There were 473 races over three days including 151 races on the Sunday, finals day. Over 2100 athletes competed, in 48 events, making it one of the largest HOSG entry fields.

2020
New Events to the program were the Year 10 division 1 eight and Year 10 Double Scull. The regatta was cancelled following the end of racing on Friday 13 March 2020 due to the Coronavirus (COVID-19) pandemic.

2021
New Events to the program were the Year 9 division 9 coxed quad scull. Changes were made to the regatta format due to the ongoing Coronavirus (COVID-19) pandemic such as limiting spectator numbers to 1,800 people and restricting access to the North Bank to athletes, coaches and school staff only.

2022
No New Events were added to the program. The Coronavirus (COVID-19) pandemic was becoming normalised resulting in the 2021 restrictions being lifted.

Location
The first HOSG was held in 1985 at Ballarat with seven events, and 240 competitors from 16 schools. In 1987, the event moved to Geelong where it has been held each year since.

In 2018, the HOSG organizing committee awarded the rights to hold the regatta in Geelong for a further 5-year period from 2020-2024 inclusive.

Management
Each year a different school would host the regatta, but as it grew in size and popularity (from 9 events in 1987 to 321 crews and 2009 competitors in 2005), the Head of the Schoolgirl Regatta Committee decided to contract the event management and official duties. 2005 was the inaugural year in which Rowing Victoria conducted the regatta on behalf of the HOSG regatta committee. Throughout the history of the regatta, the boat racing officials have been through Rowing Victoria.

Events
Racing at the Head of the Schoolgirls is in Eights, Coxed Quad Sculls, Coxed Fours, Double Sculls and Single Sculls across multiple divisions and year levels. Additional divisions have been added over the years to accommodate the increased popularity of schoolgirl rowing. As of 2021 the regatta offers the following:

Year 9 (1000m)

Coxed Quad Scull (9 Divisions);
Coxed Four (8 Divisions);
Single Scull (1 Division)

Year 10 (1000m)

Eight (1 Division);
Coxed Quad Scull (7 Divisions);
Coxed Four (6 Divisions);
Double Scull (1 Division);
Single Scull (1 Division)

Open (1500m)

Eight (4 Divisions);
Coxed Quad Scull (5 Divisions);
Coxed Four (5 Divisions);
Double Scull (1 Division);
Single Scull (1 Division)

Morongo Medals
Those girls who have competed in the Head of the Schoolgirls Regatta for three or more years, and are in Year 12, are eligible to receive a Morongo Medal. These medals have been struck to commemorate Morongo Girls' College's contribution to the HOSG as a competitor before closing and to recognize its supporters' club, the Chirnside Club, as a valued contributor to the Schoolgirls. The medal's inscription - "Sint lucernae ardentes" is translated as "Keep the lamp burning".

Results

Female School Eight Open Div 1

Female School Coxed Quad Scull Open Div 1

Female School Four Open Div 1

Female School Double Scull Open Div 1

Female School Single Scull Open Div 1

Overall

The school that has the highest medal tally for the regatta is deemed to be the Head of the Schoolgirls Champions. While no trophy is awarded for this feat, it is a source of great pride for the recipient school.

See also
Head of the River (Victoria)
Associated Public Schools of Victoria
Girls Sport Victoria (GSV)
Head of the River (Australia)

References

External links 
Rowing Australia
Rowing Victoria

Associated Public Schools of Victoria
Girls Sport Victoria
Recurring sporting events established in 1985
Rowing competitions in Australia
1985 establishments in Australia
Scholastic rowing in Australia